Robin Blau (born 1946) is an Australian artist based in Sydney.

Blau graduated in sculpture and jewellery from Sydney College of the Arts.

Work
In 1986, Blau was commissioned to make two coats of arms sculptures for Parliament House, Canberra as gifts from the Parliament and people of New South Wales. Standing at 3.9 metres tall the stainless steel sculpture contains more than 700 precision welds.

Blau's prominent public commissions have included;

 Coat of Arms, Parliament House, Canberra, 1986
 Notice Posting Column, New Acton precinct, Canberra, 2009
 Time Thief & Bower, New Acton precinct, Canberra, 2011
 Untitled sculpture, University of Canberra, 2012

 Aureole, St Patrick's Cathedral, Parramatta
 Entry gates, St Patrick's Cathedral, Parramatta
 Tabernacle, St Patrick's Cathedral, Parramatta
 Cross with Corpus, St Patrick's Cathedral, Parramatta

References 

Australian artists
1946 births
Living people